The Minister for Community Relations was a member of the Cabinet in the Parliament of Northern Ireland which governed Northern Ireland from 1922 to 1972. The post was created in 1969 and lasted until 1972. It was vacant for a month in 1971, after David Bleakley resigned.  Bleakley was not a member of the Parliament of Northern Ireland, and was therefore limited to holding a ministerial post for a maximum period of six months.

References
The Government of Northern Ireland

1969 establishments in Northern Ireland
1972 disestablishments in Northern Ireland
Executive Committee of the Privy Council of Northern Ireland